Dick Barrett (born July 23, 1942) is a Democratic member of the Montana Legislature. He was elected to House District 93 which represents a portion of the Missoula area and was the State Senator of District 45 before his retirement in 2021, with his last official session occurring in 2019. During his farewell remarks to the Montana Senate Chamber on April 25, 2019 at the Montana Capitol Building in Helena, Montana, Senator Barrett serenaded his fellow members with his rendition of Arthur Sullivan's and W. S. Gilbert's "When all night long a chap remains" from their 19th century comedic opera, Iolanthe. His rendition was recorded by the Montana Public Affairs Network and can be enjoyed here.

References

Living people
1942 births
Democratic Party members of the Montana House of Representatives
University of Wisconsin–Madison alumni
21st-century American politicians